Amphipyra effusa is a moth in the family Noctuidae. It is found from the Mediterranean region and Asia.

The wingspan is 41–48 mm. The moth flies from May to September.

The larvae feed on various plants, including Ferula, Populus, Erica, Cytisus and Cistus.

References

External links 

Fauna Europaea
Lepiforum.de

Amphipyrinae
Moths of Europe
Moths of Asia
Moths described in 1828
Taxa named by Jean Baptiste Boisduval